Christopher Jenks (born 12 June 1947) is a British sociologist who was Vice-Chancellor of Brunel University from 2006 to 2012.

He was educated at Westminster City School, the University of Surrey (BSc, 1969) and the University of London (PGCE, 1970; MSc, 1971). From 1971 to 1994, he taught at Goldsmiths College, University of London, rising to become Reader in Sociology. In 1995, he joined Brunel as Professor of Sociology and Pro-Warden. He was then pro-vice-chancellor from 2004 to 2006, before being appointed Vice-Chancellor of Brunel University in 2006. He retired in 2012 and was made emeritus professor.

References

1947 births
Living people
Alumni of the University of Surrey
Alumni of the University of London
Academics of Goldsmiths, University of London
Academics of Brunel University London